Archibald Rowan (4 October 1855 – 14 November 1923) was a Scottish footballer who played as a goalkeeper.

Career
Rowan was born on 4 October 1855. He played club football for Caledonian, Third Lanark and Queen's Park, and made two appearances for Scotland. He sometimes played under the pseudonym "A. McCallum", including in major finals.

He later served on the committee at Queen's Park, and was elected president once and chairman twice. Rowan was also a cricketer (playing for the Caledonian Cricket Club and the West of Scotland Cricket Club) golfer and billiard player. He died on 14 November 1923.

See also
List of Scotland national football team captains

References

Place of birth missing
1855 births
1923 deaths
Place of death missing
Scottish footballers
Scotland international footballers
Caledonian F.C. players
Third Lanark A.C. players
Queen's Park F.C. players
Association football goalkeepers
Scottish cricketers